Ragging is a 1973 Indian Malayalam film, directed by N. N. Pisharady. The film stars P. J. Antony, Sankaradi, Balan K. Nair and Jameela Malik in the lead roles. The film had musical score by M. K. Arjunan.

Cast
P. J. Antony
Sankaradi
Balan K. Nair
Jameela Malik
Rani Chandra
Sudheer
Vincent

Soundtrack
The music was composed by M. K. Arjunan and the lyrics were written by P. J. Antony and Isaac Thomas.

References

External links
 

1973 films
1970s Malayalam-language films